Betta fusca, commonly known as the dusky betta, is a species of gourami. It is a freshwater fish native to Asia, where it occurs on the island of Sumatra in Indonesia. The species reaches 8.2 cm (3.2 inches) in total length and is known to be a mouthbrooder and a facultative air-breather.

References 

fusca
Fish of Indonesia
Fish described in 1910
Taxa named by Charles Tate Regan